Poznań  Goats is one of the tourist attractions of Poznań. The mechanical goats' butting display takes place every day at 12:00 on the tower of the Poznań City Hall.

Goats legend

According to one version of the folk legend, when the town hall was rebuilt after the great fire in Poznań, the clock for the town hall tower was ordered from master Bartholomew of Gubin. The town council decided to celebrate this important event. A great feast was planned. A young cook, Pietrek, was appointed to prepare the main dish. Deer leg baked slowly and Pietrek was curious about what the clock mechanism looks like. The young cook could not wait to finish baking and decided to leave the kitchen for a while to look at the clock.

However, in his absence, the leg fell into the fire and burned to the coal. The terrified boy ran to a nearby meadow where the inhabitants of the city kept their animals. From there, he kidnapped two goats and took them to the town hall kitchen. The goats, however, escaped from the boy to the cornice of the town hall tower. There, in front of the gathered townsmen, two small white goats started butting. This sight amused the voivode and the invited guests. The mayor pardoned Pietrek, and the watchmaker was ordered to make a mechanism that would activate the clock goats every day. Since then, every day the trumpeter plays the bugle call and two buzzing goats show up. 

The real goats did not reach the tables of city councilors and townsmen but were returned to the poor widow, their true owner.

Goats monuments

Goat sculpture is located on Collegiate Square, near the main entrance to the Municipal Office, the former Jesuit College. The sculpture was designed by Robert Sobociński in 2002. In 2019, due to renovations of the square, the goat sculpture was moved to Chopin Park.

The monument, due to its easy accessibility from the ground level and the possibility to sit on the backs of animals, is a popular place for tourists and residents to take souvenir photographs.

Another, modern and colorful goat installation is located on Piłsudskiego street, in Rataje.

References

External links

 Poznań: The Town Hall, retrieved on 2008-06-11.
Poznań
Polish legends
Goats in art
Tourist attractions in Poznań
Polish folklore
Fiction about goats
Polish culture
1550s in Poland
1913 establishments in Poland
Medieval legends